Fusipagoda sapia is a species of sea snail, a marine gastropod mollusc in the family Retimohniidae, the true whelks and the like.

Description
(Original description as Colus (Aulacofusus) sapius) The small, thin shell measures 22 mm. The apical whorls are eroded, but six prominently rounded whorls remain. The suture is distinct and is not appressed. The whorl in front of it  is flattened and without spiral sculpture for a short distance. The shell is white with a straw-colored periostracum. The axial sculpture consists of faint incremental striae. The spiral sculpture consists of (on the penultimate whorl about eight) strong squarish ribs with subequal rather deep, channeled interspaces. Both are slightly wrinkled by the incremental lines and become obsolete on the siphonal canal. There are a few minor spirals behind the posterior rib. The aperture is roundly ovate. The thin outer lip is simple. The inner lip is erased. The white columella is twisted; its axis pervious. The narrow siphonal canal is rather long, well defined and somewhat recurved.

Distribution
This marine species occurs southwest of Sitka, Alaska.

References

 Kosyan A.R. & Kantor Yu.I. (2015). Notes on the abyssal genus Fusipagoda Habe et Ito, 1965 (Neogastropoda: Buccinidae) from the North Pacific. Ruthenica. 25(3): 77-87.

External links
 

Retimohniidae
Gastropods described in 1919